William Edward Dixon Graham (June 30, 1904 in Owen Sound, Ontario – January 11, 1979) was a Canadian ice hockey defenceman. Dixon played ten seasons in the National Hockey League (NHL) for the Chicago Black Hawks, Montreal Maroons, Detroit Red Wings, St. Louis Eagles, Boston Bruins and New York Americans between 1927 and 1937. Prior to turning professional Graham played for the Owen Sound Greys, winning the 1924 Memorial Cup as Canadian junior champions.

Playing career
As a junior player Graham played for the Owen Sound Greys, helping them win the 1924 Memorial Cup as Canadian junior champions. He played two seasons of senior hockey before he turning professional in 1926, signing with the Chicago Cardinals of the American Hockey Association. He played for the team for one year, and after they folded Graham moved cross-town to the Chicago Black Hawks of the National Hockey League (NHL). Graham's NHL debut came on November 15, 1927, against the Boston Bruins, and his first goal, and only point of the season, was on January 4, 1928, against the Montreal Canadiens.

Partway through the season Graham was traded to the Moose Jaw Warriors of the Prairie Hockey League in January 1928, though Moose Jaw traded him the same day to the Saskatoon Sheiks, where Graham finished the 1927–28 season with. He then signed with the Tulsa Oilers of the AHA, and spent the 1928–29 and most of the 1929–30 seasons there before being traded back to the Black Hawks. Graham remained with Chicago until 1933 when he was traded to the Montreal Maroons, where he played 19 games before being traded in January 1934 to the Detroit Red Wings. With the Red Wings he played 52 games over two seasons, as well as 7 games for their International Hockey League affiliate, the Detroit Olympics, before being traded again, this time to the St. Louis Eagles, where he played the last 13 games of the 1934–35 season.

The Eagles folded after the season and the players were dispersed to the other NHL teams, with Graham being selected by the Boston Bruins. He would play the 1935–36 season and the first game of the 1936–37 season with the Bruins, scoring four goals and one assist in 49 games, before being traded to the New York Americans, where he finished the 1936–37 season with, playing 31 games. Graham played a further season in the International American Hockey League before retiring in 1938. Graham subsequently became an ice hockey referee.

Grey played in two Stanley Cup Finals during his career. The first was in 1931 Stanley Cup Finals with Chicago, who lost to the Montreal Canadiens. He reached the finals again in 1934 with Detroit, joined by former Owen Sound teammate Cooney Weiland, but lost to the Black Hawks.

Career statistics

Regular season and playoffs

Notes

Bibliography

External links

1904 births
1979 deaths
Boston Bruins players
Canadian expatriate ice hockey players in the United States
Canadian ice hockey defencemen
Chicago Blackhawks players
Detroit Red Wings players
Ice hockey people from Ontario
Montreal Maroons players
New Haven Eagles players
New York Americans players
Owen Sound Greys players
Providence Reds players
Sportspeople from Owen Sound
St. Louis Eagles players
Tulsa Oilers (AHA) players